Laugh Now, Laugh Later is the eighth studio album by American punk rock band Face to Face, which was released on May 17, 2011, through Antagonist Records, a label run by the band's lead singer and guitarist Trever Keith. It marks 9 years since the release of Face to Face's previous studio album How to Ruin Everything in 2002. It is their first release with second guitarist Chad Yaro in 11 years, since 2000's Reactionary.

Artwork influence
As seen on the October 13, 2010 episode of LA Ink, tattoo artist Corey Miller produced imagery for one of the singles from the album titled "Should Anything Go Wrong". This can be seen on Trever Keith's back in the form of a tattoo.

Reception

Laugh Now, Laugh Later received positive reviews from critics. On Metacritic, the album holds a score of 67/100 based on 4 reviews, indicating "generally favorable reviews."

Track listing
 "Should Anything Go Wrong" – 3:05
 "It's Not All About You" – 3:02
 "The Invisible Hand" – 3:04
 "Bombs Away" – 3:00
 "Blood in the Water" – 3:43
 "What You Came For" – 3:13
 "I Don't Mind and You Don't Matter" – 3:42
 "Stopgap" – 04:33
 "All for Nothing" – 3:07
 "Pushover" – 2:28
 "Under the Wreckage" – 3:03
 "Staring Back" (Physical Bonus Track)
 "Persona Non Grata" (Physical Bonus Track)
 "Get Up" (bonus track)

Personnel
 Trever Keith - vocals, guitar
 Chad Yaro - guitar, vocals
 Scott Shiflett - bass, vocals
 Danny Thompson - drums
 Dennis Hill - guitar

References

Face to Face (punk band) albums
2011 albums